Peter Baida (July 26, 1950 – December 14, 1999) was an American short story writer.

Life
Baida was born in Baltimore, Maryland and graduated from the Park School of Baltimore. He graduated from Harvard College (B.A., magna cum laude, English, 1972), Boston University (M.A., 1973, creative writing), and the University of Pennsylvania with an M.B.A. in 1979.

He was the Memorial Sloan-Kettering Cancer Center's  director of direct mail fundraising from 1984 through 1999.

His work appeared in The Missouri Review,

A writer-in-residence fellowship is named for him at the Park School of Baltimore.

Awards
 1999 O. Henry Award

Works

Short stories

Non-fiction

Anthologies

Essays
"The Fear of Getting Caught", American Heritage Magazine, Jun 22, 1987
Peter Baida, "Review of Sinclair Lewis, If I Were Boss, The Early Business Stories of Sinclair Lewis," Economic History, Dec 7 1997

References

1999 deaths
American short story writers
1950 births
Harvard College alumni
Boston University College of Arts and Sciences alumni
Wharton School of the University of Pennsylvania alumni
Writers from Baltimore
Park School of Baltimore alumni
O. Henry Award winners